Ratnapur may refer to:

India
 Ratnapur, Buldhana, a panchayat village in Buldhana District, Maharashtra, India
 A historic name for Latur, a city in Maharashtra, India
 A village in Jamkhed taluka, Ahmednagar district, Maharashtra
 A village in Bijapur district, Karnataka

Nepal
 Ratnapur, Gandaki, Nepal, a market center in Chapakot Municipality
 Ratnapur, Kailali, Nepal, a village development committee
 Ratnapur, Lumbini, Nepal, a village development committee
 Ratnapur, Seti, Nepal, a village development committee

See also
 Ratnapura, Sri Lanka
 Ratanpur (disambiguation)